SWQ or swq may refer to:

 SWQ, the IATA code for Sultan Muhammad Kaharuddin III Airport, Sumbawa Besar, Indonesia
 swq, the ISO 639-3 code for Sharwa language, Far North Province, Cameroon
 iAero Airways, ICAO airline code